Ana Valeria Becerril (born 4 January 1997) is a Mexican actress. She has appeared in April's Daughter and Control Z.

Life and career 
Ana Valeria Becerril was born on 4 January 1997 in Mexico City, Mexico. She started her career in 2016 with the short film Magnífico and in the same year, she played as Camila in Camila. In 2017, she starred in April's Daughter. She received several acting awards for this film. In 2019, she played as Lucy in Muerte al Verano. In 2020, she began appearing as Sofía in the Netflix series Control Z. In 2020, she starred in the short film Aire de lluvia and in the same year, she played as Eva in Mi novia es la revolución. In 2021, she played the lead role Gina in Los Dias Que No Estuve.

Filmography

Awards

References

External links 
 

Living people
1997 births
21st-century Mexican actresses
Mexican film actresses
Mexican television actresses
Actresses from Mexico City